Odemar is a surname. Notable people with the surname include:

 Erik Odemar, known as Erik Ode (1910–1983), German actor
 Fritz Odemar senior (Karl Julius Friedrich Odemar; 1858–1926), German actor
 Fritz Odemar (Fritz Otto Emil Odemar; 1890–1955), German actor